The Williamsburg Botanical Garden is a 501(c)(3) non-profit botanical garden currently taking shape in Williamsburg, Virginia.

The garden's board was established in 2001. The garden itself occupies a site (the Ellipse Garden in Freedom Park, at 5535 Centerville Road) and continues to add features and programs. Most recently a Multigenerational Enabling Garden was added to support both children's garden programs and programs for mobility-limited adults.

The Ellipse Garden (2 acres) was dedicated in 2006. It contains more than 2,000 trees, shrubs, and other plantings in a butterfly garden, herb garden, native plant garden, perennial border, pinewoods and fernery, wetlands, and wildflower meadow.

The Garden is open every day of the year, 7:00 a.m. to sunset, with free admission. The Garden is also growing in popularity as a garden wedding venue.

See also 
 List of botanical gardens in the United States

References

External links 
 

Botanical gardens in Virginia
Tourist attractions in Williamsburg, Virginia
2001 establishments in Virginia
Protected areas established in 2001